Unshackled! is a radio drama series produced by Pacific Garden Mission, in Chicago, Illinois, that first aired on September 23, 1950. It is one of the longest-running radio dramas in history and one of a very few still in production in the United States. The show is aired over 6,500 times around the world each week on over 1,550 radio outlets, and is translated and re-dramatized into eight languages on six continents. 

As of January 2022, over 3,707 episodes have been produced, each 30 minutes in length. Unshackled! is produced in the same way as shows during the Golden Age of Radio: Actors record dialogue live before a studio audience, an organist provides live incidental music, and a sound-effects person provides sounds in real time as the show progresses. The show has retained a consistent and distinctive quality throughout its years of production, established by the 40-year tenure of Jack O'Dell as producer/director from 1950 to 1990.

Characters and stories
Each production dramatizes the testimony of someone who converts to evangelical Christianity, sometimes through a visit to Pacific Garden Mission or through hearing Unshackled! on the radio. Episodes include the life stories of baseball-great-turned-evangelist Billy Sunday, himself a Pacific Garden Mission convert, and Dominic Mance, an international banker who became a homeless vagabond nearly overnight. Past cast and crew range from current actors to Golden Age of Radio personalities such as Harry Elders, Bob O'Donnell, Jack Bivans, Stan Dale and Russ Reed.   

The scripts, with rare exceptions, are derived from actual testimonies and actual events. Beginning in the 1950s, comic book versions of many Unshackled! stories were also produced.

See also
 Adventures in Odyssey (1987-present), another long-running Christian radio drama.

References

External links
 
 Unshackled! Podcast

American Christian radio programs
Christian fundamentalism
Christian radio dramas
American radio dramas
1950 radio programme debuts
1950s American radio programs
1960s American radio programs
1970s American radio programs
1980s American radio programs
1990s American radio programs
2000s American radio programs